Hubert Hurkacz defeated Daniil Medvedev in the final, 6–1, 6–4 to win the singles tennis title at the 2022 Halle Open.

Ugo Humbert was the defending champion, but was defeated by Hurkacz in the second round.

Seeds

Draw

Finals

Top half

Bottom half

Qualifying

Seeds

Qualifiers

Qualifying draw

First qualifier

Second qualifier

Third qualifier

Fourth qualifier

References

External links
Main draw
Qualifying draw

Halle Open - 1
Singles